This article shows the rosters of all participating teams at the men's indoor volleyball tournament at the 2008 Summer Olympics in Beijing.

Pool A

The following is the Bulgarian roster in the men's volleyball tournament of the 2008 Summer Olympics.

The following is the Chinese roster in the men's volleyball tournament of the 2008 Summer Olympics.

The following is the Italian roster in the men's volleyball tournament of the 2008 Summer Olympics.

The following is the Japanese roster in the men's volleyball tournament of the 2008 Summer Olympics.

The following is the American roster in the men's volleyball tournament of the 2008 Summer Olympics.

The following is the Venezuelan roster in the men's volleyball tournament of the 2008 Summer Olympics.

Pool B

The following is the Brazilian roster in the men's volleyball tournament of the 2008 Summer Olympics.

The following is the Egyptian roster in the men's volleyball tournament of the 2008 Summer Olympics.

The following is the German roster in the men's volleyball tournament of the 2008 Summer Olympics.

The following is the Polish roster in the men's volleyball tournament of the 2008 Summer Olympics.

The following is the Russian roster in the men's volleyball tournament of the 2008 Summer Olympics.

The following is the Serbian roster in the men's volleyball tournament of the 2008 Summer Olympics.

See also
Volleyball at the 2008 Summer Olympics – Women's team rosters

References

External links
Official website

2008
2
Men's team rosters
Men's events at the 2008 Summer Olympics